Márkomeannu is a Sami cultural and music festival held near the border of the municipalities of Skånland in Troms and Evenes in Nordland in northern Norway. The idea behind Márkomeannu is to celebrate the culture and traditions of the Sámi villages. Until 2006, the festival was organized by the youth association Stuornjárgga Sámenuorak, but starting in 2007 it has been organized by its own association, Márkomeannu Searvi.

Márkomeannu consists of concerts, exhibitions, seminars and theater. The festival had 2,800 attendees in 2008.

External links
Márkomeannu

Cultural festivals in Norway
Culture in Troms
Culture in Nordland
Evenes
Recurring events established in 1999
Sámi culture
Tourist attractions in Nordland